Melinda Looi Lai Yee (born  in Kuala Lumpur, Malaysia) is a fashion designer known for her avant-garde and vintage style. She won the prize "Designer of the Year" twice at the Malaysian International Fashion Awards and latest in 2009, at the Mercedes Benz Style Fashion Awards.

Melinda has three brands: Melinda Looi Couture, Melinda Looi Prêt-à-Porter and MELL which are sold in Malaysia and have boutiques in Europe, Australia and the Middle East.

Education 
She studied at the La Salle Institute of Design in Kuala Lumpur before winning the title of Malaysia Young Designer Award in 1995. The prize was a scholarship to study at the La Salle School of Fashion in Montreal, Canada. In 1998, Melinda returned to Malaysia and worked for her parents' business for a year before venturing out on her own.

Fashion business 
Mellooi Creation was formed in the year 2000. A private limited status has been formulated and Mellooi Creation Sdn. Bhd. was created to further develop business opportunities for Melinda Looi Couture, Melinda Looi Prêt-a-Porter and MELL in local and international markets.

Mellooj consistently draws inspiration from the rich culture and ethnic diversity that characterizes Malaysia. Recently, she has participated in the Islamic Fashion Festivals in Jakarta, Indonesia, London, New York, Monte Carlo, Frankfurt and Kuala Lumpur, Malaysia, venturing into a new market with her traditional yet modern creations.

References

External links
Melinda Looi (Prêt-à-Porter) Spring/Summer 2008 Collection at Malaysia International Fashion Week

1970s births
Living people
Malaysian people of Chinese descent
People from Kuala Lumpur
Malaysian fashion designers
Year of birth missing (living people)
Malaysian women fashion designers